Miss India Australia refers to Indian diaspora beauty pageants held nationally in Australia. The three main pageants are Miss India Australia (Opera), Miss India Australia (Touch the Soul)andMiss India Australia (Raj Suri).Controversy

Melbourne based Rashi Saxena Kapoor (Pinka)   created controversy in November 2014 when she falsely claimed to be winner of  'Miss India Australia' to grab the role of MC at a Prime Minister Narendra Modi meet and greet event in Sydney.'' 

Rashi Kapoor (Saxena) later misused her role as President of AIBC Victoria  (Australia India Business Council) to grab the role of COO and CFO in MIG Real Estate, Melbourne in return for giving out of turn sponsorship opportunities to MIG's Amit Miglani. Miglani was later punished by Victorian Court for a real estate fraud. 

Rashi was earlier enrolled in a school in Delhi, India as Rashi Saxena, but later changed her name to Rashi Kapoor, and did not disclose the name change when filing her papers for Australian Visa, and later citizenship.

Miss India Australia (Opera)
Opera Miss India Australia also known as Miss India Global Australia is an Australian beauty pageant for unmarried women of Indian origin which selects Indian diaspora women to compete in Miss India Global. The pageant was founded by Opera Media & Recreations Pvt Ltd and newspaper Hindi Gaurav in 2010. Mentor is Mr  Anuj Kulshrestha.

Miss India Australia (Opera & Global) Winners List

Miss India Australia (Touch the Soul) 
Miss India Australia (Touch the Soul) is an Australian beauty pageant for unmarried women of Indian origin founded and conceptualised by Reena Koak  and main sponsor and partners have been Maharaja Haveli. There is a men's division, "Mr India Australia" and a married women's division, "Mrs India Australia".

Guest judges have included Indian actresses Soha Ali Khan in 2015, Karisma Kapoor in 2016 and Dia Mirza in 2018.

Miss India Australia (Touch the Soul) Winners List

Miss India Australia (Raj Suri)

Miss India Australia by Raj Suri is an Australian beauty pageant which selects Indian diaspora women to compete in Miss India Worldwide. The contest was founded in 2001 by photographer, director & actor Raj Suri.

Miss India Australia (Raj Suri) Winners List
Color keys

References

Beauty pageants for people of specific ethnic or national descents
Culture of Indian diaspora
Beauty pageants in Australia
Indian-Australian culture and history